Sumedang (former spelling: Soemedang) is a town in Western Java, Indonesia, approximately 46 km northeast of Bandung. It is the capital of Sumedang Regency. The town is just south of the volcanic Mount Tampomas, which is 1,684 m (5,525 ft) high and is usually climbed from Cimalaka District, 7 km from Sumedang.

Sumedang's museum, Prabu Geusan Ulun, houses a collection of traditional Sundanese weaponry, as well as some crown jewels and other finery. It is on Geusan Ulun Road.

The town is famous for Sumedang tofu, a local variety of deep fried tofu which was first made by a Chinese immigrant, Ong Kino.

In the district surrounding the town lies Cadas Pangeran, a section of the trans-Java postal road constructed on the order of Dutch governor named Willem Daendels during the first quarter of the 19th century. The section is famous due to difficulty during the construction, which required blasting of a mountainside. Hence "cadas" which means mountain rock in Sundanese. The section was finished due to cooperation between the governor, regent Kusumadinata known as "pangeran kornel", and the people of Sumedang, although with considerable ill-feeling on the part of the regent and the people due to forced labor practice. A statue commemorating this event is erected on the section.

The town housed the exiled Indonesian national heroine (female hero) named Cut Nyak Dhien from Aceh during her old age, after she was captured during the Aceh War at the beginning of the 20th century. Her tomb is near the town.

Culinary

The Sumedang town is well-known for its fried tofu called tahu sumedang, which its original name was "tahu bunkeng". Tahu Bunkeng is one of the oldest tofu stores in the city of Sumedang. The authentic "Bunkeng" tofu was first made by a Chinese immigrant by the name of Ong Kino, who came from Anxi County, Quanzhou City, Hokkian Province, China, in the early 20th century.

"Tahu Bunkeng" outlet is located in Sumedang's city centre on Jalan 11 April No. 53, Tegalkalong. There are several branches in the city on Jalan M. Abdurahman No. 50, Jalan M. Abdurahnam No. 155, and Jalan Prabu Gajah Agung.

References 

sumedangkab
sumedang.org

 
Populated places in West Java

ace:Kabupaten Sumedang
fr:Kabupaten de Sumedang
id:Kabupaten Sumedang
jv:Kabupatèn Sumedang
nl:Sumedang
no:Sumedang
ro:Sumedang
su:Kabupatén Sumedang